Pârâul Mic may refer to the following rivers in Romania:

 Pârâul Mic (Ghimbășel), a tributary of the Ghimbășel in Brașov County
 Pârâul Mic, a tributary of the Luncșoara in Arad County
 Pârâul Mic, a tributary of the Mărcușa in Covasna County